Bolshoye Korovino is a rural locality (a village) in Nikolotorzhskoye Rural Settlement, Kirillovsky District, Vologda Oblast, Russia. The population was 41 as of 2002.

Geography 
Bolshoye Korovino is located 36 km northeast of Kirillov (the district's administrative centre) by road. Dorogusha is the nearest rural locality.

References 

Rural localities in Kirillovsky District